The 1982 PBA All-Star Series is the first official North vs South All-Star Game series by the Philippine Basketball Association and was presented by Mello Yello. 

The PBA North All-Stars defeated the South team with a more total points in the two-game series, 242-240. The South All-Stars won the first game in Cebu Coliseum, 122-119, on Saturday, October 23. The North team won the second game on the following day in Manila, 123-118. Arnie Tuadles was picked by co-players in the series as Most Valuable Player (MVP). The Toyota forward had a total of 70 points in two games, including a career-high 50 points made in Cebu.

Roster

North All-Stars

South All-Stars

Results

References

Philippine Basketball Association All-Star Weekend
Sports in Cebu